Southern View is a village in Sangamon County, Illinois, United States. The population was 1,642 at the 2010 census. It is part of the Springfield, Illinois Metropolitan Statistical Area.

Geography
Southern View is located at  (39.756260, -89.650370).

Demographics

As of the census of 2000, there were 1,695 people, 798 households, and 453 families residing in the village. The racial makeup of the village was 96.34% White, 0.83% African American, 0.53% Native American, 0.83% Asian, 1.06% from other races, and 0.41% from two or more races. Hispanic or Latino of any race were 1.71% of the population.

There were 798 households, out of which 24.6% had children under the age of 18 living with them, 43.9% were married couples living together, 10.9% had a female householder with no husband present, and 43.2% were non-families. 36.2% of all households were made up of individuals, and 15.4% had someone living alone who was 65 years of age or older. The average household size was 2.12 and the average family size was 2.79.

In the village, the population was spread out, with 19.8% under the age of 18, 6.8% from 18 to 24, 31.7% from 25 to 44, 21.8% from 45 to 64, and 19.9% who were 65 years of age or older. The median age was 40 years. For every 100 females, there were 85.7 males. For every 100 females age 18 and over, there were 81.7 males.

The median income for a household in the village was $37,964, and the median income for a family was $47,386. Males had a median income of $32,284 versus $27,188 for females. The per capita income for the village was $18,633. About 4.7% of families and 7.6% of the population were below the poverty line, including 7.1% of those under age 18 and 4.4% of those age 65 or over.

References

Villages in Sangamon County, Illinois
Villages in Illinois
Springfield metropolitan area, Illinois